"Haters" is a song by American girl group TLC, from their fifth studio album, TLC (2017). It was released on October 26, 2016, in Japan and November 1, 2016 in New Zealand. The song was later released as the second single from the album on May 5, 2017, in other countries. The song was written by Michael Busbee, Daniel Ullman, Bryan Jarett, Maureen McDonald.

The song was first sung by the British girl group The Rosso Sisters in 2014 under the name "We Don't Care About That Anyway". It was performed live by the group during Demi Lovato's Neon Lights Tour, but never released as a single.

Background and promotion
On October 26, 2016, TLC released two singles "Joyride" and "Haters" exclusively in Japan as a follow up to promote their upcoming fifth studio album TLC. "Joyride" shot to number one on the iTunes chart in Japan upon its release. On November 1, 2016, the song was released in New Zealand. The song was before released as "We Don't Care About That Anyway" by The Rosso Sisters in 2014.

Critical reception
The song was met with positive reviews from critics. Billboard gave a positive review of the song "Last month, Chilli and T-Boz shared the first single from that album, the Snoop Dogg collab "Way Back". And now they've got another new song. This one is called "Haters", and like their 1999 hit "Unpretty", it's a sort of self-empowerment anthem, a call to stop listening to whatever petty criticisms people might have. Also, TLC invited some of their fans to be in the Haters video. TLC included them as a thank you for their support and also to inspire them not to let haters deter them from being themselves. The production is a throwback, too, to that late-'90s retro-futuristic style." HotNewHipHop called the track an "empowering anthem" stating "Bringing the title to life, T-Boz & Chilli call out their "haters" & naysayers in this empowering new single, while promoting self-confidence in the process. "Haters gonna hate / People gon' say what they gon' say / We don't care about that anyway," they sing."

Track listings

Release history

References

2016 songs
2016 singles
2017 singles
Cooking Vinyl singles
TLC (group) songs
Songs written by Mozella
Songs written by busbee